The 2016–17 Arkansas Razorbacks women's basketball team represented the University of Arkansas in the 2016–17 NCAA Division I women's basketball season. The Razorbacks, led by third year head coach Jimmy Dykes, play their games at Bud Walton Arena and are members of the Southeastern Conference. They finished the season 13–17, 2–14 in SEC play to finish in last place. They lost in the first round of the SEC women's tournament to Florida.

On March 3, Jimmy Dykes resigned as head coach. He finished at Arkansas with a 3-year record of 43–49.

Roster

Schedule

|-
!colspan=9 style="background:#C41E3A; color:#FFFFFF;"| Exhibition

|-
!colspan=9 style="background:#C41E3A; color:#FFFFFF;"| Non-conference regular season

|-
!colspan=9 style="background:#C41E3A; color:#FFFFFF;"| SEC regular season

|-
!colspan=9 style="background:#C41E3A;"| SEC Women's Tournament

See also
2016–17 Arkansas Razorbacks men's basketball team

References

Arkansas
Arkansas Razorbacks women's basketball seasons
Arkansas Razor
Arkansas Razor